Mihail Popov (born 16 April 1976) is a former Bulgarian badminton player, and later represented France. He represented Bulgaria at the 2000 Summer Olympics in the men's singles and doubles event. He now works as a Bulgarian national badminton coach. Popov had won seven Bulgarian National Championships title, 3 in the singles event, and four in the men's doubles event partnered with Svetoslav Stoyanov. In France, he clinched two times men's doubles national title in 2004 partnered with Manuel Dubrulle, and in 2007 with Stoyanov.

Achievements

IBF World Grand Prix 
The World Badminton Grand Prix was sanctioned by the International Badminton Federation from 1983 to 2006.

Men's doubles

IBF International 
Men's singles

Men's doubles

Mixed doubles

References

External links 
 
 

1976 births
Living people
Sportspeople from Sofia
French male badminton players
Bulgarian male badminton players
Olympic badminton players of Bulgaria
Badminton players at the 2000 Summer Olympics
Badminton coaches
20th-century Bulgarian people
20th-century French people